The National Propane Gas Association (NPGA) is an American trade association representing and advocating on behalf of the U.S. propane and renewable propane industries.  Propane has a low-carbon content, has no methane emissions, is nontoxic, and is designated an approved clean, alternative fuel under the Clean Air Act Amendments.

History

Established in 1931 as the National Bottled Gas Association (NBGA), in 1937 the name changed to the Liquified Petroleum Gas Association (LPGA) to encompass the entire LP-gas industry.  In 1942, LPGA opened an office in Washington, DC to strengthen the industry’s voice on Capitol Hill and promote the use of LP-gas as essential to the war effort.  Post-World War II, state associations emerged, conventions and trade shows resumed, and LPGA moved its main office from New York to Chicago. In 1959, the organization became the National Liquified Petroleum Gas Association (NLPGA) and in 1987, it became the National Propane Gas Association (NPGA).  The Chicago office closed in 2007, consolidating the NPGA office in Washington, DC.  

Governance & Structure

NPGA is governed by a Board of Directors with a Chairman, Chairman-Elect, Vice Chairman, Treasurer and Secretary. Six standing committees oversee a wide range of topics concerning the industry and the association:  Audit; Conventions; Governmental Affairs; Member Services; Propane Supply & Logistics; and Technology, Standards & Safety. Committee members formulate policies and programs which advance the interests of the industry in those areas.  

NPGA has more than 2,300 member companies in all 50 states and 12 countries; 36 state and/or regional associations; and three business councils/membership interest groups:  Women in Propane Council, Benchmarking Council, and Cylinder Exchange Council.   

Policy & Advocacy

NPGA’s mission is to advance safety and to increase the use of propane through sound public policy at the federal and state levels. NPGA advocates on a range of funding, safety, and regulatory issues on Capitol Hill and with federal agencies including the U.S. Department of Energy, the Federal Energy Regulatory Agency (FERC), the Occupational Safety & Health Administration (OSHA), the Pipeline and Hazardous Materials Safety Administration (PHMSA), the Federal Motor Carrier Safety Administration (FMCSA) and more.    

Its political action committee – PropanePAC – is supported by individual members of the industry and works to support the election of congressional candidates who support the propane industry and the legislative priorities of NPGA.

At the state level, NPGA tracks and analyzes thousands of state bills and public utility dockets every year, and participates with state partners in bill amendment proposals, letter writing, securing testimony, and grassroots campaigns in dozens of states.

Programs 

NPGA offers a variety of programs to benefit its members and the propane industry. Workforce development programs include:

·      an online training course for entry-level drivers working to obtain a commercial driver’s license (CDL) and/or hazardous materials (hazmat) endorsement.  The Administrative Compliance Experts (ACE) program assists the propane industry in complying with federal regulations for commercial drivers, helping to get commercial drivers on the road and working faster.

·      a Registered Apprenticeship Program in partnership with the Propane Education & Research Council (PERC). This national program helps build the future workforce by working with business partners to provide learning opportunities and jobs for those pursuing careers in the propane industry. 

·      a scholarship program for the children of NPGA member company employees. Since 1995, the National Propane Gas Foundation (NPGF) has provided $2,252,500 in scholarships to more than 1,500 students enrolled in college and technical programs across the country. Annually, NPGF typically awards more than 100 scholarships, with several earmarked for students pursuing careers in the propane industry. 

Other programs include meetings and events to network, educate, advocate, and promote new equipment and services including:

·      Southeastern Convention & International Propane Expo™ – a large annual tradeshow and professional development event attended by thousands of propane industry representatives and 250+ exhibitors from around the world.

·      Propane Days – a legislative conference held annually in June in Washington, DC.  This event brings together federal policymakers and industry leaders to discuss the uses of propane, its role as a clean and efficient energy source, and the propane industry’s contribution to the U.S. economy. 

Publications

NPGA publishes a weekly e-newsletter called The Bobtail, an Annual Report, Member Alerts, and other membership and advocacy materials. Its website is www.npga.org.

References

External links
 National Propane Gas Association

Trade associations based in the United States
Energy business associations
Lisle, Illinois
Organizations established in 1931
Propane